Perfect is a Polish rock band founded in 1977 by drummer Wojciech Morawski, bass guitar player Zdzisław Zawadzki and lead guitar player Zbigniew Hołdys. They are one of the all-time most popular rock bands from/in Poland.<ref>Spin, </ref>

History
Initially, the band played easy-listening pop music under the name Perfect Super Show and Disco Band. Their line-up included Basia Trzetrzelewska, who would later join Matt Bianco. After her departure in 1980, the band changed their name to 'Perfect' and turned to hard rock music with Grzegorz Markowski as their lead vocalist. In 1981, Perfect recorded their debut album that sold almost one million copies in Poland alone. It included their first hits, Nie płacz Ewka ("Don't Cry, Eve") and Chcemy być sobą ("We Want to be Ourselves"), released as a 7-inch single. Their second album, UNU, released in late 1982, in a period when martial law was introduced in Poland. It sold less than half million copies (vinyl + CD reissue) and included another classic song: Autobiografia ("Autobiography"), dedicated to a Polish rock-and-roll generation that grew up under communist rule. In 1983, Perfect released their first live album that sold 200 000 copies. Subsequently, they disbanded, only occasionally appearing on stage – in 1987 (Poland), 1989 and in the early 1990s, when they toured in the United States twice. The original line-up without Holdys reunited in 1994 and recorded their fourth studio album Jestem ("I am") which included another hit Kołysanka dla nieznajomej'' ("A Lullaby for a Stranger"), and sold over 130 000 copies. The band remained active until 2021.

Before 2021, the band wanted to do a farewell tour, they released their last single Głos (voice) in 2020 and started touring all across Poland. On the 27 April 2021, Grzegorz Markowski announced via the Facebook page of his daughter that his health was going down. The rest of the band said they would play on "for Grzegorz". That never happened. Instead, a few weeks later the band disbanded.

Band members

Current members
 Dariusz Kozakiewicz – lead guitar 
 Grzegorz Markowski – lead vocals 
 Jacek Krzaklewski – rhythm guitar 
 Piotr Urbanek – bass guitar

Past members
 Zbigniew Hołdys – guitars, vocals 
 Zdzisław Zawadzki – bass guitar 
 Ryszard Sygitowicz – guitars 
 Basia Trzetrzelewska – vocals 
 Ewa Korczyńska-Konarzewska – vocals 
 Wojciech Morawski – drums 
 Piotr Szkudelski – drums

Timeline

Discography

Studio albums

Live albums

Video albums

References

External links
 
 

Polish rock music groups
Musical groups established in 1977